The Lett Hotel at 204 S. Ash in Yuma, Colorado, now known as the Tumbleweed Hotel, is a historic building, built in 1916, that is listed on the National Register of Historic Places.  It was the longest operating hotel in Yuma, and had served 73 years at the time of its NRHP listing in 1990.

It was deemed significant as "one of the most prominent buildings in Yuma", a building that has been photographed and painted, and having been "among the first of its kind in northeastern Colorado with modern conveniences of steam heat and hot and cold running water."  At the time of NRHP listing, it was largely the same as when built by John
Andrew Lett.

References

Hotel buildings on the National Register of Historic Places in Colorado
Buildings and structures in Yuma County, Colorado
National Register of Historic Places in Yuma County, Colorado